Windham County is a county located in the U.S. state of Vermont. As of the 2020 census, the population was 45,905. The shire town (county seat) is Newfane, and the largest municipality is the town of Brattleboro.

History
Fort Bridgman, Vernon, was burned in 1755, a casualty of the French and Indian War. The Court of Common Pleas (established 1768) of the County of Cumberland (established July 3, 1766) of the Province of New York was moved to the town of Westminster in 1772. On July 4, 1776, the Province of New York became an independent state.

On January 15, 1777, Vermont declared its independence from New York, and functioned as an independent republic until statehood in 1791. Cumberland County (N.Y.) and Gloucester County (N.Y.) were extinguished when Vermont declared its independence from New York; Albany County (N.Y.) and Charlotte County (now Washington County, N.Y.) were eliminated from Vermont.

Unity County was formed March 17, 1778, the eastern of the two original Vermont Republic counties. Unity County was renamed Cumberland County on March 21, 1778. Cumberland County and Bennington County (the eastern original county) exchanged land, adjusting their early border. On February 16, 1781 Rutland County was created from Bennington County, and Orange, Windham and Windsor Counties were created from Cumberland County. Some authors assume Cumberland County was renamed Windham County in 1781. Several original sources indicate Cumberland County was dissolved rather than renamed. This was probably to make a clean legal break from any connection with Cumberland County, New York, as some authors indicate the Cumberland County, Vermont Republic, records remained in Windham County. Newfane became the Shire Town of Windham County before 1812.

Geography
It is the third-largest county in Vermont by land area.

Adjacent counties
 Windsor County - north
 Sullivan County, New Hampshire - northeast
 Cheshire County, New Hampshire - east
 Franklin County, Massachusetts - south
 Bennington County - west

Reservoirs
 Ball Mountain Lake
 Harriman Reservoir (also sometimes called Lake Whitingham or Whitingham Reservoir)
 Townshend Lake

National protected areas
 Green Mountain National Forest (part)
 Silvio O. Conte National Fish and Wildlife Refuge (part)

Demographics

2000 census
As of the census of 2000, 44,216 people, 18,375 households, and 11,447 families resided in the county. The population density was 56 people per square mile (22/km2). There were 27,039 housing units at an average density of 34 per square mile (13/km2). The county's racial makeup was 96.72% White, 0.50% Black or African American, 0.22% Native American, 0.79% Asian, 0.04% Pacific Islander, 0.32% from other races, and 1.42% from two or more races. 1.11% of the population were Hispanic or Latino of any race. 18.1% were of English, 13.3% Irish, 9.5% French, 8.9% American, 7.7% German, 6.0% Italian and 5.0% French Canadian ancestry. 95.9% spoke English, 1.3% Spanish and 1.2% French as their first language.

There were 18,375 households, of which 29.90% had children under the age of 18 living with them, 49.20% were married couples living together, 9.60% had a female householder with no husband present, and 37.70% were non-families. 29.70% of all households were made up of individuals, and 10.20% had someone living alone who was 65 years of age or older. The average household size was 2.35 and the average family size was 2.91.

In the county, the population was spread out, with 23.50% under the age of 18, 7.10% from 18 to 24, 28.10% from 25 to 44, 27.20% from 45 to 64, and 14.00% who were 65 years of age or older. The median age was 40 years. For every 100 females there were 95.00 males.  For every 100 females age 18 and over, there were 91.80 males.

The county's median household income was $38,204, and the median family income was $46,989. Males had a median income of $31,094 versus $24,650 for females. The county's per capita income was $20,533. About 6.10% of families and 9.40% of the population were below the poverty line, including 12.00% of those under age 18 and 7.90% of those age 65 or over.

2010 census
As of the 2010 United States Census, 44,513 people, 19,290 households, and 11,453 families resided in the county. The county's racial makeup was 95.3% white, 1.0% Asian, 0.9% black or African American, 0.3% American Indian, 0.5% from other races, and 2.0% from two or more races. Those of Hispanic or Latino origin made up 1.8% of the population. The largest ancestry groups were:
  21.8% Irish
  21.7% English
  12.3% French
  11.7% German
  8.6% Italian
  8.2% American
  5.5% Polish
  4.9% French Canadian
  4.5% Scottish
  3.2% Scotch-Irish
  3.0% Swedish
  1.2% Welsh

Of the 19,290 households, 26.2% had children under the age of 18 living with them, 44.8% were married couples living together, 10.1% had a female householder with no husband present, 40.6% were non-families, and 31.8% of all households were made up of individuals. The average household size was 2.23 and the average family size was 2.79. The median age was 44.9 years.

The county's median household income was $46,714 and the median family income was $58,814. Males had a median income of $40,872 versus $33,278 for females. The county's per capita income was $27,247. About 6.3% of families and 11.1% of the population were below the poverty line, including 13.3% of those under age 18 and 7.7% of those age 65 or over.

Politics and government
In 1828, Windham County was won by National Republican Party candidate John Quincy Adams and by Henry Clay in 1832.

From William Henry Harrison in 1836 to Winfield Scott in 1852, the county would vote the Whig Party candidates.

From John C. Frémont in 1856 to Richard Nixon in 1960, the Republican Party would have a 104-year winning streak within Windham County.

In 1964, the county was won by Democratic Party incumbent President Lyndon B. Johnson, who became not only the first Democratic presidential candidate to win the county, but to win the state of Vermont entirely.

Following the Democrats victory in 1964, the county went back to voting for Republican candidates for another 16 year winning streak starting with Richard Nixon in 1968 and ending with Ronald Reagan in 1984, who became the last Republican presidential candidate to win the county, winning it with 54% of the vote to 45% for Walter Mondale.

In 1988 the county was won by Michael Dukakis and has been won by Democratic candidates ever since.

By some accounts, Windham County is now considered the 'bluest' county in the 'bluest' state in the USA. It was Vermont's bluest county in the 2000, 2004, 2008 and 2012 U.S. presidential elections. Then-Vice President Al Gore won the county by an 18.4% margin over then-Texas Governor George W. Bush, with 53% of the vote to Bush's 34%. In 2004, John Kerry carried the county by a 35.2% margin over President Bush, with Kerry carrying the state by 20.1% over Bush. In 2008, Barack Obama won Windham by 48.1% margin over John McCain, with Obama winning by 37% over McCain statewide. In 2012, Obama won Windham County by a 48.7% margin over Mitt Romney.

In 2006, four towns in Windham County, Dummerston, Marlboro, Newfane, and Stratton, had their citizens pass resolutions supporting the proposed impeachment of President George W. Bush.

|}

County law enforcement
The Windham County Sheriff's Department is one source of law enforcement in this county especially in areas with no local police departments. Where no coverage exists, the Vermont State Police are the de facto law enforcement agency. The following towns maintain a contract with the Windham County Sheriff's Department for patrol services: Athens, Dummerston, Grafton, Guilford, Jamaica, Marlboro, Newfane, Putney, Townshend, Westminster, Windham, and Vernon.

In 2006, Sheriff Sheila Prue pled guilty to stealing department funds, using department equipment for personal use and for mismanagement of the department.

Transportation

Roads and highways
Windham County is crossed by:

Bus
Local bus service, particularly in and around Brattleboro and Bellows Falls, is provided by Connecticut River Transit's "The Current". The Current includes the entire Brattleboro BeeLine bus system, composed of the Red, Blue and White Lines, which also go to West Brattleboro and Hinsdale, New Hampshire. The Deerfield Valley Transit Association's fare-free MOOver serves mostly the southwestern portion of the county, especially the town of Wilmington and nearby ski areas. The MOOver also has bus connections to Bennington (in a partnership with the Green Mountain Express) to the west and Brattleboro, connecting to other local and intercity buses in both towns.

The national intercity bus service Greyhound serves Windham County with stops in Brattleboro and Bellows Falls daily.

Rail
Amtrak, the national intercity rail network, operates its Vermonter, running daily from St. Albans, Vermont to Washington, DC through Bellows Falls and Brattleboro with one daily northbound and southbound stop in both stations in the county.

Communities

Towns
In Vermont, towns are contiguous named places, subdivisions of counties, where there is permanent, year-round human population. They are usually formally incorporated, governing themselves in open town meetings (with very few exceptions), and their usual elected administrative body is called a selectboard. Though Brattleboro is by far the most populous town in the county, the historic "shire town" (county seat) is Newfane, and Windham County Superior Court is still there, as are the offices of the County Sheriff and the County Clerk.

 Athens
 Brattleboro
 Brookline
 Dover
 Dummerston
 Grafton
 Guilford
 Halifax
 Jamaica
 Londonderry
 Marlboro
 Newfane (shire town)
 Putney
 Rockingham
 Somerset
 Stratton
 Townshend
 Vernon
 Wardsboro
 Westminster
 Whitingham
 Wilmington
 Windham

Villages
Villages are named places and sometimes formal census divisions, but may or may not be incorporated separately within a town's borders.

Incorporated villages
 Bellows Falls
 Jacksonville
 Newfane
 Saxtons River
 Westminster

Census-designated places

 Algiers
 Brattleboro
 Chimney Hill
 Grafton
 Harmonyville
 Jamaica
 Londonderry
 North Westminster
 Putney
 South Londonderry
 Stratton Mountain (also in Winhall in Bennington County)
 Townshend
 Wardsboro
 West Brattleboro
 West Dummerston
 Whitingham
 Wilmington

Other villages

 Cambridgeport
 Dover
 Dummerston Center
 East Dover
 East Dummerston
 East Jamaica
 Halifax Center
 Houghtonville
 Rawsonville
 South Newfane
 South Wardsboro
 South Windham
 Wardsboro Center
 West Dover
 West Halifax
 West Townshend
 West Wardsboro
 Westminster Station
 Westminster West
 Williamsville

See also
 List of counties in Vermont
 List of towns in Vermont
 National Register of Historic Places listings in Windham County, Vermont
 Historical Society of Windham County

References

External links
 The Windham Regional Commission
 Windham County Sheriff's Department
 The Mount Snow Valley Chamber of Commerce
 The Historical Society of Windham County
 Windham County history and genealogy

 
1781 establishments in Vermont
Populated places established in 1781